Africa Speaks is the twenty-fifth studio album by American rock band Santana, released on June 7, 2019 by Concord Records and Suretone Records.

The album was produced during a 10-day recording session by Rick Rubin at Rubin's Shangri-La recording studio in Malibu, during which they recorded 49 songs. Rubin and Carlos Santana used an eight-piece band (which included Santana's wife, Cindy Blackman Santana, on drums).

The first single from the album, "Breaking Down the Door", was released on April 19, 2019. In January 2019, Santana released the EP In Search of Mona Lisa, which served as a preamble to the LP. The album debuted at number three on the US Billboard 200.

Origins 
Africa Speaks is inspired by music from the continent of Africa, and has been called a "unique fusion of rock, Latin and jazz". Many of the album's tracks were recorded in one take. The album features vocals from Spanish singer Buika.

In January 2019, Carlos Santana spoke with Rolling Stone about his new music, explaining how he said to Rubin, "'I know you've worked with everybody like Johnny Cash and the Chili Peppers and Metallica,' And he goes, 'Well, what are you interested in doing?' I said, 'Nothing but African music.' So can you believe it? We record 49 songs in 10 days. He was very gracious, because it was like a hurricane to record six, seven songs in a day. Rick said, 'With Clive Davis, you had a bunch of guest stars and singers. Who do you want in here?' I said, 'I only want two women: Laura Mvula and Buika.' And he said, 'OK.' So we called them and they said yes."

Release

Africa Speaks was released on June 7, 2019 by Concord Records and Suretone Records. In the United States, it debuted at number three on the Billboard 200 and at number one on Top Latin Albums with 57,000 equivalent album units. It also became the Latin album with most sales in a single week since Romeo Santos' Formula, Vol. 2 in March 2014, as well as the best-performing week for a Spanish-language record since Billboard began to rank albums based on equivalent units in late 2014. It has also ranked at number one on the Latin Albums Sales chart for 13 consecutive weeks between June 22 and September 14, 2019. Africa Speaks was the best-selling Latin album of the first half of 2019 in the United States, with 63,000 copies sold as of June 20.

Touring 
Santana was set to headline in August 2019 at both Woodstock 50 and Bethel Woods' half-centennial celebration in Bethel, NY. Prior and before these two events, the band toured from April to November 2019 in support of the new album. The celebration show in Bethel did occur. However, Woodstock 50 was canceled due to permit issues.

Track listing

Personnel 

 Buika – lead vocals
 Laura Mvula – additional vocals (track 5)
 Carlos Santana – guitars, percussion, backing vocals
 David K. Mathews – Hammond B3 organ, keyboards
 Salvador Santana – keyboards (track 7)
 Tommy Anthony – guitars, musical GPS
 Benny Rietveld – bass guitar
 Cindy Blackman Santana – drums
 Karl Perazzo – timbales, congas, percussion
 Ray Greene – trombone, backing vocals
 Andy Vargas – backing vocals
 Dizzy" Daniel Moorehead – saxophone

Technical 
 Produced by Rick Rubin
 Executive production, conception, arrangement & musical direction by Carlos Santana
 Mixed by Dana Nielsen
 Recorded by Greg Fidelman, Dana Nielsen & Rob Bisel
 Assisted by Sara Lynn Killion, Dylan Neustadter & Tyler Beans
 Additional engineering by Jim Reitzel
 Mastered by Stephen Marcussen
 Production coordination by Dave Hanych & Eric Lynn
 Production assistants: Colin Willard, Jeremy Hatcher, Garry Purchit, Gabe Smith, Chloe Poswillo & Ethan Schneiderman
 Artwork by Rudy Gutierrez
 Graphic art by Heather Griffin-Vine

Charts

Weekly charts

Year-end charts

References 

2019 albums
Santana (band) albums
Albums produced by Rick Rubin
Concord Records albums
Albums recorded at Shangri-La (recording studio)